Roger Phillip Graham (February 20, 1909 – March 2, 1966) was an American science fiction writer who was published most often using the name Rog Phillips, but also used other names. Of his other pseudonyms, only Craig Browning is notable in the genre. He is associated most with Amazing Stories and is known best for short fiction. He was nominated for the Hugo Award for Best Novelette in 1959.

Biography

Roger Phillip Graham was a man of many names. He had twenty pseudonyms, including: Clinton Ames, Drew Ames, Robert Arnette, Franklin Bahl, Alexander Blade, Craig Browning, Gregg Conrad, P.F. Costello, Sanandana Kumara, Charles Lee, Charles Mann, Milton Mann, Inez McGowan, Melva Rogers, Chester Ruppert, William Carter Sawtelle, A.R. Steber, Gerald Vance, John H. Wiley, and Peter Worth.

Roger Phillip Graham was born in Spokane, Washington, on February 20, 1909. Growing up during the Great Depression, Rog became familiar with being on the road which began his love affair with the United States. His father, John Alfred Graham, a veteran of the Spanish–American War moved his family around the country looking for work. Despite this Rog received a fine education. For instance, there was his sophomore year spent at Kingfisher High School in Tulsa, Oklahoma. But in 1931 he was back in Spokane attending and graduating from Gonzaga University. He also studied at the University of Washington in Seattle.

Graham was a power plant engineer until the beginning of World War II, when he became a shipyard welder. He was also a longshoreman during this phase of his life. After the war Rog became a full-time writer, and wrote some three-million words using a myriad of different pseudonyms.

On October 8, 1938, at the age of twenty-nine, Rog married Eleanor Cora Smith. They lived together in Kirkland, Washington, with a cat and a dog "trained to do tricks," and he worried "about the termites who [were] eating away at the foundations of his house." The couple were next-door neighbors to Jack and Dot de Courcy (a couple who would also become science fiction pulp writers as well). By 1946 Rog was divorced from Eleanor.

The Club House

Graham's first published work was a detective story, "Murder Note," as by Charles Mann, that appeared in the Winter 1943 issue of The Masked Detective. However, it was editor of Amazing Stories, Raymond A. Palmer, who started Rog on his science fiction career with a $500 advance in 1945 for his first story, "Let Freedom Ring!" Graham moved to Evanston, Illinois, to be near Palmer, and associate editor, William Hamling.

In response to falling sales, due to the Shaver Mystery Hoax, Palmer instituted a column in March 1948 of fan news and fanzine reviews in Amazing Stories. Called The Club House it was a groundbreaking series that brought the entire community together at just the right time. Conducted by Rog Phillips, now an official staff columnist for Ziff Davis, with just the right flair in his editorials he single-handedly created science fiction fandom as it is now known during the subsequent 57 appearances.

During this period 1946 to 1953, Rog experienced the height of his success. His work was catching on. Donald H. Tuck in his bio/bibliography, The Encyclopedia of Science Fiction and Fantasy, Vol. 2: Who's Who, M-Z (Advent:Publishers, Chicago, 1978), of Rog Phillips lists several stories of interest, including “Atom War” (Amazing Stories, May 1946); “So Shall Ye Reap!” (Amazing Stories, August 1947); “M’Bong-Ah” (Amazing Stories, February 1949); “The Cyberene” (Imagination, December 1953).

There is no question that among his best work during this early period were the six stories in his Lefty Baker series: “Squeeze Play" (Amazing Stories, November 1947); “The Immortal Menace” (Amazing Stories, February 1949); “The Insane Robot” (Fantastic Adventures, November 1949); “It’s Like This” (Fantastic Story Quarterly, November 1952); “Lefty Baker’s Nuthouse” (Imaginative Tales, January 1958); “…But Who Knows Huer, or Huen?” (Fantastic, November 1961). After reading each one the reader can tell that Rog had fun writing them. Each Lefty Baker tall-tale drips with his wit and especially his exceptional sense of humor.

His original work, Time Trap, published by Century Pocket Books in 1949 (#116), has been cited as being one of the first, if not the first, original science fiction paperback ever printed, because it was the first printed in mass-market rack size. Century Books followed Time Trap by publishing Worlds Within (#124, 1950) and World of If (as by Merit Books, #B-13, 1951). Of some passing interest the Century/Merit Books publishing house was a notorious Chicago Mob (organized crime) operation. Organized crime played and continued to play a major part in publishing during this era, mostly due to its almost complete control of
distribution throughout the United States.

On Tuesday, October 24, 1951, Graham married Mari Wolf at Country Church in the city of Chicago. As a wedding gift, publisher William Hamling hired Mari Wolf to write a column identical to The Club House, Fandora's Box, for his fledgling science fiction magazine, Imagination. In 1955 Graham divorced Mari Wolf.

The apex to the first half of his science fiction writing career came in July 1952 when he proudly announced in The Club House that Melvin Korshak of Shasta Publishers was going to publish a book of his, Frontiers in the Sky. Shasta never did. Shasta was shortly caught up in a scandal of epic proportion when it failed to pay Philip José Farmer for winning a writing contest when he submitted a manuscript for a novel that later became the first in the award-winning Riverworld series To Your Scattered Bodies Go. As a consequence Shasta folded. But not before mention of Rog’s forthcoming book appeared in a blurb on the back of the dust cover for This Island Earth, by Raymond F. Jones, yet another Shasta title.

Rog’s career never really recovered in the manner it deserved. Had Shasta published his book his memory and legacy would have been assured. Almost all the titles they printed have become major collector’s items over the years, and Rog’s name would have been in the forefront.

Graham was a staffer working for Ziff Davis making $1,000 a month, when new editor Howard Browne came into his own, and Graham was there when they hired a new copy boy, Frank M. Robinson, who would go on to become a major science fiction writer in his own right.

The final blow came when Ziff Davis moved its headquarters to New York City. So after 57 appearances, The Club House made its final debut in the March 1953 issue, and with the exception of the appearance of one more story later that year, so did Rog. After writing up to three stories an issue Rog did not make another appearance in Amazing Stories for the next four years. Only when editor Paul W. Fairman took over the reins would Amazing Stories publish an additional eight stories during the 1957-1959 apex of Rog’s career. It seems that editor Howard Browne finally got his way when he was promoted and seized control of the magazine, firing Rog as he had often threatened to do and using the money saved to replace him in the very next issue with a story by Robert A. Heinlein, the novelette "Project Nightmare."

After a years' hiatus the next appearance of The Club House column was in the July 1954 issue of Universe Science Fiction, another Ray Palmer publication. Five appearances later it was over when Universe folded in March 1955. But another Palmer publication, Other Worlds Science Stories, was there to pick up the column.

Five appearances in Other Worlds Science Stories, from May 1955 to April 1956, and both were defunct. Coincidentally, Imagination, a Hamling publication, had been running an identical column, Fandora's Box, conducted by Mari Wolf, Rog's wife. It ran from April 1956 until June 1956, exactly one bi-monthly issue after Other Worlds Science Stories folded. The column ended, as did their marriage, at nearly the same time.

With the dwindling acceptance of his fiction, Rog had begun writing a series of regular articles for Mystic magazine, yet another Palmer publication, with such philosophical articles as "Searching for the Elixir of Life," as by Drew Ames.

In 1957 Graham got married again, to Honey Wood. And as a member of the Outlander fan group, Graham became Program Director for the 1958 Westercon. Honey Wood was a member of the planning committee, helping Rick Sneary with the bookkeeping. The Solacon (SoLaCon: South Los Angeles Convention; the official nickname for the Sixteenth World Science Fiction Convention, also called the 11th Westercon) was organized and run by the Outlanders, a noted West Coast science fiction fan club that had been seeking the convention with a nearly ten-year campaign hyped as "South Gate in '58!" Graham manufactured the Hugo Award trophies for 1958.

It was during this time that Graham reemerged as a front running science fiction writer with such notable stories as: "Game Preserve" (If, October 1957) that can be found in Judith Merril's SF '58: The Year's Greatest Science Fiction and Fantasy (Gnome Press, 1958), and "The Yellow Pill" (Astounding, October 1958) that can be found reprinted in Judith Merril's SF '59: The Year's Greatest Science Fiction and Fantasy (Gnome Press, 1959). Yet, it seems that these stories have been eclipsed by his psychological thriller the lesser known but equally brilliant "Rat in the Skull" (If, December 1958), which received a well deserved Hugo Award nomination. At the end of his career, Graham was just beginning to receive the recognition his body of work so richly deserved.

As only a true romantic such as Graham could truly appreciate he had his swan song shortly before his too-short career ended. His first, and only, hardbound novel, The Involuntary Immortal, enlarged from a Fantastic Adventures novelette (December 1949) was published by Avalon in 1959 only a few years before he started to become too sick to continue to write.

Final years

Until his death in 1966 only a few more original stories would appear, seven in total, all of them in a different genre, detective/mystery, all within the pages of the Alfred Hitchcock's Mystery Magazine.

Even though Graham was clearly ill, he kept himself involved with his first love, fandom, as long as he could, with a last official public appearance as Guest of Honor at Westercon XIII in Boise, Idaho, during the July 3–5, 1960 weekend.

Roger Phillip Graham died on March 2, 1966, of heart complications, at the age of 56. He had been under a doctor's care for the last six years of his life and was scheduled to have heart surgery to replace a defective valve. After being hospitalized for a preoperative period in late February 1966, he was placed into intensive care after he entered a coma. He never recovered.

Bibliography

Speculative short stories

A nearly complete listing of Roger Phillip Graham's speculative fiction can be found at the Internet Speculative Fiction Database website.

What follows is a short list of some of his better known works out of the 205 stories he wrote. As well as 19 early reprints, 20 articles, 1 cite, at least 8 fanzine articles, 67 The Club House columns, 3 paperbacks, and 1 hardcover.

Let Freedom Ring!, Amazing Stories (December 1945)
Atom War, Amazing Stories (May 1946)
The Mutants, Amazing Stories (July 1946)
Battle of the Gods, Amazing Stories (September 1946)
The House, Amazing Stories (February 1947)
So Shall Ye Reap!, Amazing Stories (August 1947)
Starship from Sirius, Amazing Stories (August 1948)
Cube Root of Conquest, Amazing Stories (October 1948)
Tillie, Amazing Stories (December 1948)
The Unthinking Destroyer, Amazing Stories (December 1948)
Unthinkable, Amazing Stories (April 1949)
Bubastis of Egupt, Other Worlds Science Stories (December 1950)
The Old Martians, If Worlds of Science Fiction (March 1952)
From This Dark Mind, Fantastic (November–December 1953)
Ye of Little Faith, If Worlds of Science Fiction (January 1953)
The Yellow Pill, Astounding (October 1958)
Rat in the Skull, If Worlds of Science Fiction (December 1958)
The Gallery, Amazing Stories (January 1959)

Works Other Than Speculative

Murder Note. as by Charles Mann, The Masked Detective (Winter 1943)
Frame for a Fed, F.B.I. Detective Stories (June 1950)
To Dream of Murder, Famous Detective Stories (February 1954)
Portrait of the Artist's Wife, as by Inez McGowan, Ladies' Home Journal (April 1958)
A Case of Homicide, Keyhole Mystery Magazine (June 1960)
Good Sound Therapy, Mike Shayne Mystery Magazine (October 1960)
The Full Treatment, Alfred Hitchcock's Mystery Magazine (January 1961)
The Egg Head, Alfred Hitchcock's Mystery Magazine (August 1961)
First Come, First Served, Alfred Hitchcock's Mystery Magazine (October 1962)
Justice, Inc., Alfred Hitchcock's Mystery Magazine (January 1963)
Experience is Helpful, Alfred Hitchcock's Mystery Magazine (March 1964)
Legacy of Office, Alfred Hitchcock's Mystery Magazine (June 1964)
The Hypothetical Arsonist, Alfred Hitchcock's Mystery Magazine (December 1965)

Free works

The Gallery  
Unthinkable

Paperbacks

Time Trap, Century Books (1949) 
Worlds Within, Century Books (1950) 
World of If, Merit Books (1951)

Hardcover

The Involuntary Immortals, Avalon (1959) [This title is still under copyright!]

Posthumous works

The Essential Rog Phillips
33 short stories spanning Phillips' career

Rog Phillips’ The Club House
Containing all 67 appearances of The Club House

Author: Roger Phillip Graham

Edited and with an introduction: Earl Terry Kemp

Introduction: “Roger Phillip Graham: The Man Who Was Rog Phillips,” by Earl Terry Kemp; pp. xv-xxiii

Afterword: “Roger Phillips,” by Robert Silverberg; pp. 573–578

The Last Stand; October 2014; softcover; cover artist: Steve Stiles

630 pages; with black and white illustrations; 8 ½ x 11 inches

The Complete Lefty Baker
Author: Rog Phillips [Roger Phillip Graham]

Edited and with an introduction: Earl Terry Kemp

Introduction: by Earl Terry Kemp; pp. xi-xii

Goldleaf Books; October 2012; softcover; cover artist: Earl Terry Kemp

113 pages

The Best of Rog Phillips, Volume II
Author: Rog Phillips [Roger Phillip Graham]

Edited and with an introduction: Earl Terry Kemp

Introduction: by Earl Terry Kemp; pp. xi-xii

Goldleaf Books; January 2013; softcover; cover artist: Earl Terry Kemp

181 pages

The Best of Rog Phillips, Volume III
Containing: Time Trap and Worlds Within

Author: Rog Phillips [Roger Phillip Graham]

Edited and with an introduction: Earl Terry Kemp

Introduction: by Earl Terry Kemp; pp. xi-xii

Goldleaf Books; March 2013; softcover; cover art and design: Earl Terry Kemp

254 pages

The Best of Rog Phillips, Volume IV
Containing: World of If, Game Preserve, The Yellow Pill, and The Rat in the Skull

Author: Rog Phillips [Roger Phillip Graham]

Edited and with an introduction: Earl Terry Kemp

Introduction: by Earl Terry Kemp; pp. xi-xiii

Goldleaf Books; October 2014; softcover; cover art and design: Earl Terry Kemp

211 pages

References

The Encyclopedia of Science Fiction, page 928.

External links
 
 
 
 

20th-century American novelists
American male novelists
American science fiction writers
1909 births
1965 deaths
American male short story writers
20th-century American short story writers
20th-century American male writers